The 1999 Georgia Southern Eagles football team represented Georgia Southern University as a member of the Southern Conference (SoCon) during the 1999 NCAA Division I-AA football season.  Led by third-year head coach Paul Johnson, the Eagles compiled an overall record of 13–2 with a conference mark of 7–1, winning the SoCon title. Georgia Southern defeated Youngstown State in the 1999 NCAA Division I-AA Football Championship Game to win the program's fifth NCAA Division I-AA title. The Eagles played their home games at Paulson Stadium in Statesboro, Georgia.

Schedule

References

Georgia Southern
Georgia Southern Eagles football seasons
NCAA Division I Football Champions
Southern Conference football champion seasons
Georgia Southern Eagles football